Yolette Lévy (May 15, 1938 – December 6, 2018) was a Haitian-born Canadian politician and activist from Val-d'Or, in Abitibi-Témiscamingue, Quebec. She was for many years a municipal councilor in Val-d'Or. Originally a pharmacist, she also worked as a feminist activist, trade unionist, and defender of the rights of seniors.

Early life
Yolette Lévy was born May 15, 1938, in Haiti. Hailing from Cap-Haïtien, she worked as a pharmacist in her country of origin.

After Haiti
Lévy fled Duvalierism to teach for four years in Zaire (now the Democratic Republic of Congo) in the service of UNESCO. She and her husband, Jean-Emmanuel Alfred, then submitted their applications for teaching positions in Val-d'Or. She arrived in Val-d'Or in 1969, to work as a chemistry teacher at the Le Carrefour high school.

Lévy sat for 13 years as municipal councilor in Val-d'Or, from 1996 to 2009. She was elected in the municipal elections of 2000, 2001 and 2005, but lost the 2009 elections. During her mandates, she contributed to the revision of the family policy, the implementation of the Taxibus public transport service, defending community organizations, and supporting cultural development.

She first became involved in the teachers' union in 1972. On April 8, 1982, she was elected president of the Union of Education Workers of Northwestern Quebec (STENOQ) and held this position for three years, until June 1984. In June 1984, she was elected to the executive council of the School Board Teachers Commission of the Centrale des syndicats du Québec.

During her union career, she defended several issues concerning women, such as maternity leave, the right to abortion, child care services, and led a major push for pay equity. She also led workshops on the involvement of women in politics.

With several others, she filed the organization's letters patent on November 23, 1990, with the Quebec government. The association received its official recognition on February 13, 1991.

Lévy served as vice-president of the board of directors of the Université du Québec en Abitibi-Témiscamingue (UQAT) from 1998 to 2005.

Personal life
She was the mother of three children: Yolette, Jean-Emmanuel, and Henry-Philippe Alfred.

In December 2017, the Regroupement des femmes de l'Abitibi-Témiscamingue supported the creation of an honorary prize, the Yolette Lévy Award.

Yolette Lévy died December 6, 2018, at the Maison de la source Gabriel, a hospice in Val-d'Or, Quebec, Canada.

Awards and honours
 2005: Alexina-Croteau Prize, prize from the Regroupement des femmes de l'Abitibi-Témiscamingue which highlights the work of women who have distinguished themselves by their constant commitment to the cause of women in local and regional development
 2007: Personality Award from the Val-d’Or Chamber of Commerce
 2007: Prix Charlie Biddle, prize that highlights the exceptional contribution of people who have immigrated to Quebec and whose personal or professional commitment contributes to the cultural and artistic development of Quebec
 2017:  (Lieutenant Governor's Medal)

References

1938 births
2018 deaths
Haitian emigrants to Canada
People from Val-d'Or
20th-century Canadian politicians
Canadian feminists
Canadian women trade unionists
Trade unionists from Quebec
Pharmacists
Black Canadian women
People from Cap-Haïtien